Mary Patricia Thurston is a career diplomat with the country of New Zealand. As of 2017 she was New Zealand's Ambassador to Poland, Ukraine, Latvia, Lithuania, Estonia and Georgia.

Thurston attended Oxford University where she studied English and French for a Bachelor of Arts (Honours) degree.  She speaks French, Spanish and Solomon Islands Pijin.

Thurston was previously Deputy High Commissioner at the New Zealand High Commission Singapore and Deputy Special Coordinator of the Regional Assistance Mission to Solomon Islands (RAMSI).

References

Year of birth missing (living people)
Living people
Ambassadors of New Zealand to Poland
Ambassadors of New Zealand to Ukraine
Alumni of the University of Oxford